is a Japanese  manga written and illustrated by Naoyuki Ochiai. A modern adaptation of Fyodor Dostoyevsky's Crime and Punishment, it is about Miroku Tachi, a hikikomori who decides to kill the leader of a student prostitution ring and take her money. The manga was serialized in Futabasha's manga magazine Manga Action from January 23, 2007 to March 15, 2011 and was collected into ten  volumes. The manga was licensed in North America by JManga and was one of its release titles. In 2012, the manga was adapted into a live-action drama by WOWOW with six episodes.

Plot

Media

Manga 
The manga is an adaptation of  Fyodor Dostoyevsky's Crime and Punishment by Naoyuki Ochiai. It was serialized in Futabasha's manga magazine Manga Action from January 23, 2007 to March 15, 2011 and was collected into ten  volumes. The manga was licensed in North America by JManga and was one of its release titles when the website launched on August 17, 2011. JManga published the first five volumes before becoming defunct. The manga was also published in France by Delcourt (under the title ) and in Taiwan by Ever Glory Publishing.

Chapter list

Live-action drama 
In 2012, the manga was adapted into a live-action drama with six episodes airing from April 29, 2012 to June 3, 2012 on WOWOW. The drama was directed by Manabu Aso, with the screenplay by Yumiko Kamiyama and Tadasuke Fujimoto, and music by Kōji Endō.

Cast
 Kengo Kora – Miroku Tachi
 Asami Mizukawa – Echika Ameya
 Ayumi Ito – Yoshino Tachi
  – Kikuo Ameya
 Ai Hashimoto – Hikaru Baba
 Akiyoshi Nakao – Masamichi Yazumi
 Shōta Sometani – Haruka Mikoshiba
  – Akemi Nakagami
  – Risa Shimazu
 Hisako Manda – Yoshimi Tachi
 Tetsushi Tanaka – Kai Sudo
 Masatō Ibu – Kurodo Goi

Reception 
Chavez found the characters and visual presentation to challenge him, with the protagonist's duality making him come back to read more. However, referring to the poor sales of Naoki Urasawa's Monster, he doubted that the American market was "interested in dramas of this caliber".

The manga was part of the selection list for "Best Manga Series 2010" at the 18th .

References

External links
 
 Official drama website 

Manga series
2007 manga
Seinen manga
Futabasha manga
Delcourt (publisher) titles
Manga based on novels
Crime and Punishment
Japanese television dramas based on manga
Wowow original programming
2012 Japanese television series debuts
2012 Japanese television series endings